Locomotor system may mean:

 Animal locomotion system
 Human musculoskeletal system, also known simply as "the locomotor system"